Ochanja market is a market in Woliwo community in Onitsha South local government area of Anambra State.

References 

Retail markets in Anambra
Retail markets in Nigeria
Onitsha